Bear Branch is a stream in Moniteau County in the U.S. state of Missouri. It is a tributary of Burris Fork.

Bear Branch was named for the fact the area was a hunting ground of bears by pioneer citizens.

References

Rivers of Moniteau County, Missouri
Rivers of Missouri